Alexander Wilson (August 16, 1833March 4, 1888) was an American lawyer and Republican politician.  He was the 12th Attorney General of Wisconsin, serving from 1878 through 1882, and served several years as a district attorney and county judge in Iowa County, Wisconsin.

Biography
Born in Westfield, New York, Wilson graduated from Union College in 1854, studying the science and civil engineering course.  He taught school for two winters at Huntley, Illinois, then moved to Dubuque, Iowa, where he read law and worked as a land surveyor.  He was admitted to the bar in the Fall of 1855, and moved to Wisconsin later that year.

He settled at Mineral Point, Wisconsin, in Iowa County, and worked for several years as a teacher, served on the board of education, and was elected city superintendent of schools. While teaching, he read law in the offices of Cobb & Messmore.  In 1860, he began his own law practice in partnership with E. P. Weber.  He was elected district attorney at the fall 1860 general election and was elected to the office again in 1864 and 1866.  In December 1867, he was appointed county judge of Iowa County, replacing Luman M. Strong, who died in office.

In 1874, he established a private bank in partnership with Edward Harris.  The bank later developed into the City Bank of Mineral Point.

He was elected Attorney General of Wisconsin in the general election of 1877 and was re-elected in 1879.  The Wisconsin Bar Association described Wilson as conservative, patient, and safe.

After leaving office in 1882, Wilson returned to his private law practice.  He died in March 1888 in Lincoln, Nebraska, while en route to California. He is buried in Wyuka Cemetery in Lincoln.

Electoral history

| colspan="6" style="text-align:center;background-color: #e9e9e9;"| General Election, November 6, 1877

| colspan="6" style="text-align:center;background-color: #e9e9e9;"| General Election, November 4, 1879

References

1833 births
1888 deaths
Union College (New York) alumni
Politicians from Dubuque, Iowa
People from Westfield, New York
People from Mineral Point, Wisconsin
Wisconsin state court judges
Wisconsin Attorneys General
District attorneys in Wisconsin
19th-century American judges